Brandenburg is one of Germany's sixteen Bundesländer (federal states).

Brandenburg may also refer to:

Places
Brandenburg an der Havel, a town in Brandenburg, Germany
Brandenburg Euthanasia Centre, a Nazi killing facility located in the aforementioned town
Brandenburg-Görden Prison, a prison located nearby the aforementioned town
Margraviate of Brandenburg, a medieval German principality (1157–1806), at times partitioned into
Brandenburg-Ansbach, a margraviate 
Brandenburg-Bayreuth, a margraviate 
Brandenburg-Kulmbach, a margraviate
Brandenburg-Küstrin, a margraviate
Brandenburg-Schwedt, a margraviate
Brandenburg-Stendal, a margraviate and state in the Holy Roman Empire
Brandenburg-Prussia (1618–1701), a historical state consisting of the Margraviate of Brandenburg and the Duchy of Prussia
Province of Brandenburg (1815–1945), a province of Prussia, Germany
Brandenburg (1945-1952), a subdivision of the Soviet occupation zone and state of East Germany
Neubrandenburg (New Brandenburg), a town in Mecklenburg-Western Pomerania, Germany
Brandenburg, Kentucky, a city in the United States
Brandenburg (Frisches Haff), former name of Ushakovo in Kaliningrad Oblast, Russia

Transportation
, a class of battleships built by Germany in the 1890s
, the lead ship of the class
, a class of frigates operated by the German Navy
, the lead ship of the class

Berlin Brandenburg Airport (BER/EDDB)
BER Airport station (disambiguation)

Other uses
Brandenburg (ballet), a 1997 ballet by Jerome Robbins
Brandenburg (surname)
Brandenburg concertos, a collection of instrumental works by Johann Sebastian Bach
Brandenburg v. Ohio, a United States Supreme Court case
Brandenburg, a 2005 book by journalist Henry Porter
Brandenburg, a 1994 novel by Glenn Meade
Brandenburgers, a German commando unit during World War II

See also
Brandenburg Gate (disambiguation)
List of rulers of Brandenburg
List of places in Brandenburg
Berlin-Brandenburg (disambiguation)
Brandenbourg, a village in Luxembourg